The following is a list of hospitals in Kalutara District, Sri Lanka. The biggest government hospitals in the district, known as line ministry hospitals, are controlled by the  central government in Colombo. All other government hospitals in the district are controlled by the provincial government in Colombo.

Government hospitals

Central government hospitals

Teaching hospitals
  Teaching Hospital, KaluthraKalutara

Divisional hospitals (type B)
 Beruwala Divisional Hospital, Beruwala
 Dharga Town Divisional Hospital, Dharga Town

Provincial government hospitals

Base hospitals (type A)
 Horana Base Hospital, Horana
 Panadura Base Hospital, Panadura

Base hospitals (type B)
 Agalawatta Base Hospital, Pimbura

Divisional hospitals (type A)
 Bandaragama Divisional Hospital, Bandaragama
 Ingiriya Divisional Hospital, Ingiriya
 Matugama Divisional Hospital, Matugama

Divisional hospitals (type B)
 Baduraliya Divisional Hospital, Baduraliya
 Bulathsinhala Divisional Hospital, Bulathsinhala
 Ittepana Divisional Hospital, Ittepana
 Meegahatenne Divisional Hospital

Divisional hospitals (type C)
 Gonaduwa Divisional Hospital, Morontuduwa

Private hospitals
 Family Care Hospital, Kalutara
 New Philip Hospital, Kalutara
 Sachithra Hospital, Panadura
 Medihelp Hospital, Horana
 MDK Hospital, Horana 
 Curendo Abortion center by   
  Homoeopathic drugs and unauthorized drugs

See also
 List of hospitals in Sri Lanka

References
 
 
 

Kalutara
Kalutara